Lower Town (also spelled "Lowertown" is a neighbourhood in Rideau-Vanier Ward in central Ottawa, Ontario, Canada, to the east of downtown. It is the oldest part of the city.  It is bounded by Rideau Street to the south, the Ottawa River to the west and north and the Rideau River to the east.  It includes the commercial Byward Market area in the south-western part, and is predominantly residential in the north and east.

It was historically French Canadian and Irish (as opposed to English and Scottish Upper Town, a term no longer in use) and is to this day home to many Franco-Ontarian families, businesses and institutions.

Public facilities
 Lowertown Pool - a public in-ground swimming pool with rope & diving board. Sauna & change rooms on-site. Ample free parking available.

Population
The total population of Lower Town (including Porter Island), according to the Canada 2011 Census, is 12,274.

Ethnic diversity
According to the City of Ottawa website, there are roughly 4,180 native English-speakers in Lower Town, 3,530 Francophones, and 2,235 with other mother tongues.  Lower Town is home to a wide variety of immigrants and visible minorities, of which there are 2,495.

Lowertown's population is rather diverse. Its main stretch along Rideau Street is very bustling and includes many African, Asian, South Asian, Caribbean, and Lebanese businesses, a large grocery store, the Rideau Branch of the Ottawa Public Library, and an Orthodox Jewish synagogue.

Crime
Byward Market and Lower Town have been and are usually ranked among the top neighbourhoods for repeated calls for services and resources from the city.
Byward Market and Lower Town had on average 6.5 shooting incidents each year from 2016-2019 out of a total of 73.5 yearly for the same period in Ottawa, representing roughly 9% of the city’s shooting incidents taking place in the neighbourhood.
The Lowertown Community Association has been active in advocating for more resources for policing and support services. According to a 2018 report commissioned by the community association, crimes against individuals are 3 times higher and crimes against property are 2 times higher than the city average, due to the high number of bars in the neighbourhood as the nightlife and entertainment centre of the city.
The Ottawa Police Service deployed a neighbourhood resource team to the ByWard Market and Lowertown since 2020.  
The Ottawa Police Services 2021 Annual Report found that that Rideau Vanier had 5,593 crimes reported (11,165.9 crimes/100,000 people) the second highest rate after Somerset Ward.

Modern Urbanization
As part of the Gréber Plan for Ottawa, new parkways, roads and bridges were constructed in the post-war period as a plan for urban renewal and "improvement" of Ottawa. This period saw major upheaval in the area as dozens of city blocks and hundreds of historic homes were systematically demolished to make way for expanded roads and new development. However, while the redevelopment was done in Lower Town, neighbouring areas opposed the plans, leaving the current incomplete solution to traffic through the area, heavy truck traffic, and poor urban streetscape for Lowertown residents to cope with.

King Edward Avenue
Today, King Edward Avenue is a six lane main road running north–south through the centre of the neighbourhood. It is connected on its north to the MacDonald Cartier Bridge, a main connection with Gatineau, Quebec, which leads to heavy traffic travelling to and from Gatineau through the area. The traffic exits Lower Town either to the east along St. Patrick or to the south along Rideau and Nicholas to the 417 highway, as south of Rideau, King Edward is a four-lane (and further south, two-lane) road through the Sandy Hill residential neighbourhood with no heavy truck traffic allowed.

The street is so large and so busy that it exists as a major barrier between the east and west halves of Lowertown. Since it is the main truck route between Ottawa and Gatineau there are large numbers of tractor trailers travelling through the core of Ottawa daily, along with tens of thousands of commuters in cars.  It is one of the highest accident sites in Ottawa.

The road from the bridge was intended to connect to a new Vanier Parkway to the north of the neighbourhood, across Green Island and Maple Island. This connector was never built because of political opposition, and instead St. Patrick Street east of King Edward was built into a major four-lane thoroughfare cutting through the neighbourhood. The end of the connector from the bridge instead connects to King Edward at a sharp turn where the connector would have continued directly to the east.

King Edward was itself rebuilt into a six-lane major thoroughfare from Sussex Drive to Rideau Street, and the plan was to continue the six-lane through Sandy Hill to connect to the Queensway (417) highway. This also was never built.

Rideau Street

Rideau Street has had its share of major development and redevelopment spanning over three decades. Prior to the typical appearance of shopping malls, the characteristic sign of modern suburbanization commonly seen as North American cities increase in size and population, Rideau Street west of King Edward was a popular shopping area of Ottawa. For many years, Rideau Street was one of Ottawa's primary retail thoroughfares, containing department stores such as Freimans, Ogilvy's, Woolworth, Caplan's and Metropolitan.  Although the local department stores are gone, Rideau Street still features The Bay department store, the Rideau Centre shopping mall, and the street is adjacent to shops of the Byward Market.

The Byward Market, to the north of Rideau Street has consistently thrived throughout ongoing development in surrounding areas. To the south, the Rideau Centre development, a four-level shopping centre, began construction in 1981 continuing through 1982 and upon completion, provided a shopping mall atmosphere upon its official opening on March 16, 1983, as retailers moved inside. As part of the construction, the section of Rideau Street between Sussex Drive & Dalhousie Street was turned into a major bus interchange, which would undergo many major changes in the decades to come, seeing the originally constructed enclosed bus shelters replaced for covered shelters in the 1990s.

Further development began once a 230,000 ft expansion of the Rideau Centre was undertaken by Cadillac Fairview on September 26, 2013. The transit shelters underwent another major change during this time, including their relocation and modernization, as construction of Rideau Station, one of 13 stops announced as part of O-Train Line 1, named Confederation Line, began in August 2013, as part of Ottawa's existing light-rail system built and operated by OC Transpo.
Rideau Street stretches throughout the traditional Lower Town district of Ottawa, of both commercial and residential areas which in the past was predominantly Francophone, but now has one of Ottawa's largest immigrant populations, notably including many Francophone Africans and Somalis. North of Rideau and west of King Edward is typically considered the commercial Byward Market area.

Embassies   
Embassy of the People’s Republic of China 
Embassy of Denmark 
Embassy of Estonia 
Embassy of Japan 
Embassy of the Republic of Korea 
Embassy of the State of Kuwait  
High Commission of Malaysia 
Embassy of the Philippines 
Embassy of Romania 
Embassy of Saudi Arabia 
Embassy of Sweden 
Embassy of Turkey 
Embassy of the United Arab Emirates 
Embassy of the United States

See also

List of Ottawa neighbourhoods
Rideau Street

External links
Bytown.net article 'Evolution of an Ottawa Neighbourhood'
Lowertown Community Association
Lowertown history: Virtual Museum of Canada Exhibit

References

Bibliography

Neighbourhoods in Ottawa
Historic districts in Canada
Historic Jewish communities in Canada